The saline red bat (Lasiurus salinae) is a species of bat from the family Vespertilionidae. It was formerly included as a subspecies or a synonym of the eastern red bat and the desert red bat, but is distinct. The species is present in Argentina, and its type locality has been found in the city of Cruz del Eje in the Córdoba Province.

See also 
 Desert red bat
 Eastern red bat

References 

Lasiurus
Bats of South America
Endemic fauna of Argentina
Mammals of Argentina
Mammals described in 1902
Taxa named by Oldfield Thomas